Jan Vering (1954  – 1 January 2021) was a German gospel singer, newspaper editor and dramaturge at the Apollo Theater in Siegen.

Life 
Vering was born in Münster and grew up in Vechta. He performed spirituals, gospels and songs by Duke Ellington in jazz clubs, in youth centres and at Kirchentag conventions. In 1983, he took part in a project about Martin Luther King's "I Have a Dream" ("Ich habe einen Traum") by writer Christian A. Schwarz and composer Siegfried Fietz. He often performed with the pianist Johannes Nitsch and the guitarist Werner Hucks.

Vering appeared as a singer for 18 years, performing more than 2500 concerts in Europe. He turned to a position as dramaturge at the new Apollo-Theater in 2007, retiring 10 years later.

Vering died in a nursing home in Wilnsdorf on the night of 1 January 2021.

Work

Books 
 Zeugen zur Sache. Hänssler, Holzgerlingen 1981
 Ein Lesebuch. Oncken, Kassel 1988
 Siegfried Fietz – Von guten Mächten und bewegten Zeiten (biography of Siegfried Fietz) Gerth Medien, Asslar 2011, .
 Aufbruch wagen: Skulputen, Bilder. Kunstbroschüre. Abakus Musik Barbara Fietz, Greifenstein 2012

Audio books 
 Liedbeschreibung. , Wetzlar 1988
 Zeugen zur Sache. ERF-Verlag, Wetzlar 1988
 Biografie von Siegfried Fietz: Von guten Mächten und bewegten Zeiten. Abakus Musik, Greifenstein 2017

References

External links
 

1954 births
2021 deaths
German gospel singers
German newspaper editors
German dramatists and playwrights